Hell Bent Forever: A Tribute to Judas Priest is a tribute album, released in 2008. It includes several rock and metal bands such as Motörhead, Icarus Witch, L.A. Guns and Sepultura, covering songs by British heavy metal band Judas Priest. The album's font is a mistake (or a joke) because the lettering is in the style of Iron Maiden's logo instead of the one of Judas Priest.

Track listing

"Breaking the Law" (Motörhead)
"Metal Gods" (Fozzy)
"Electric Eye" (Jani Lane)
"Desert Plains" (Vince Neil)	
"Diamonds & Rust" (Great White)
"Heading Out to the Highway" (Angel City Outlaws)
"Devil's Child" (Broken Teeth)
"Hell Bent for Leather" (Warrant)
"You've Got Another Thing Coming" (FireHouse)	
"Living After Midnight" (L.A. Guns)
"Turbo Lover" (Sin City All-Stars)
"Exciter" (Tim "Ripper" Owens)
"Screaming for Vengeance" (Sepultura)
"The Ripper" (Icarus Witch)

References

Judas Priest tribute albums
2008 compilation albums
Heavy metal compilation albums